The Mongolia–Russia border is the international border between Mongolia and the Russian Federation. It runs from west to east between the two tripoints with China for 3,452 km (2,145 mi). The boundary is the third longest border between Russia and another country, behind the Kazakhstan–Russia border and the China–Russia border.

Description
The border starts in the west at the western tripoint with China, located just 100 kilometres (62 miles) east of the China-Kazakhstan-Russia tripoint. It then proceeds overland in a broadly north-east direction through the Altai Mountains, up to the vicinity of Mongolia's Uvs Lake, briefly cutting into the lake so as to leave the far north-eastern corner in Russia. The border then proceeds eastwards via a series of overland lines, angled slightly to the south-east; this section also cuts across Lake Tore-Khol. The border then turns north across the Ulaan Taiga mountains, forming a broad arc through the Sayan Mountains around Mongolia's Lake Khövsgöl. The border continues overland eastwards, arching broadly north (a short part of which utilises the river Chikoy) and then south in two long arcs, before turning north-east and then east, skirting south of Russia's Lake Barun-Torey, to terminate at the eastern Chinese tripoint.

Tripoints
The eastern and western end points of the Mongolia–Russia border are tripoints, i.e. junctions with  the China–Russia border and the China–Mongolia border. A special trilateral agreement, signed on January 27, 1994, in Ulaanbaatar, determines the location of these two tripoints. The agreement is based on earlier bilateral treaties between the parties involved.

The trilateral agreement specifies that a border monument was to be erected at the eastern tripoint, called Tarbagan-Dakh
The border monument and the access roads for it are visible on Google Maps, at approximately 
).

The trilateral agreement states that no marker will be erected at the western tripoint, which was defined as the peak of the mountain Tavan-Bogdo-Ula (Kuitunshan 奎屯山, Tavan Bogd Uul; elevation approx. 4081–4104 m, location, due to its remote and hard to access location, on a mountain covered with perpetual snows.

History

Russian had expanded far into Siberia during the course of the 17th century, bringing it into conflict with Qing China, who at that time ruled Mongolia (called 'Outer' Mongolia, to differentiate it from Inner Mongolia which was under more effective Chinese control). Much of the line of the today's Mongolia–Russia border line was set by the Treaty of Kyakhta (1727) between the Russian and China, however the treaty left Tuva on the Chinese side of the border. The line was confirmed via the Treaty of Saint Petersburg in 1881.

With China engulfed in chaos following the collapse of the Qing dynasty in 1911, Mongolian nationalists seized the opportunity to declared Outer Mongolia independent, with the support of Russia. Russia also took advantage of China's weakness to annex Tuva, thereby creating the modern Mongolia–Russia border. In 1915 the Second Treaty of Kyakhta was signed, by which Russia acknowledged formal Chinese suzerainty over Mongolia, albeit with Russia maintaining significant influence, leaving the country in effect as a semi-autonomous condominium. Following the Russian Revolution in 1917 China invaded Mongolia in an attempt to re-assert full control, however they were ultimately repulsed by Mongol and Soviet Russian forces, with Mongolia declaring independence in 1921, which was not recognised by China until 1946. Although an independent Tuvan People's Republic was declared in 1921, this small country became fully annexed into the Soviet Union in 1944, whereupon the former Mongolia–Tuva border became a section of the Mongolia–Soviet border. The latter stayed stable for the rest of the Soviet Union's existence, and continued as the Mongolia–Russia border after the dissolution of the Soviet Union in 1991.

Border crossings
At the border there are ten official crossing points. Two of them are railway crossings, but only one (Naushki) has passenger traffic. Three highway border crossing points are designated as "multilateral", for any passport holders (Tashanta-TcagaanNur, Kyakhta-Aganbulag, Solovjovsk - Erentsav). Another five highway border crossing points are designated as "bilateral", meaning that they are only open to the citizens of the two bordering countries, and not to third-country nationals. The border crossing point near the famous Khövsgöl lake (Mondy-Khankh) is bilateral.

Border violations
According to an article published in 2005, the main problems at the Russian-Mongolian border, specifically in its  Republic of Tuva section, were cross-border livestock theft (in both directions) and smuggling of meat.

Administrative divisions

Federal subjects of Russia bordered by Mongolia
Four federal subjects of Russia border Mongolia:
Altai Republic
Tuva Republic
Republic of Buryatia
Zabaykalsky Krai

Provinces of Mongolia bordered by Russia
Eight provinces of Mongolia border Russia:

Bayan-Ölgii
Uvs
Zavkhan
Khövsgöl
Bulgan
Selenge
Khentii
Dornod

Settlements near the border

Mongolia

 Qara modun 
 Züünxövöö
 Tooromt
 Altay
 Burğaasa
 Zelter
 Sükhbaatar
 Altanbulag
 Çuluunkhoroot/Ereencav

Russia

 Qızıl-Xaya
 Sagly
 Xandağaytı
 Dus-Dag
 Ça-Sur
 Aq-Erik
 Xol-Ooju
 Erzin
 Tarıs-Arjan
 Ush Bel-dyr
 Mondy
 Moğoytı
 Turan
 Kyren
 Sanaga
 Yengorboy
 Şara-Azarğa
 Dutulur
 Zakamensk
 Xoltısın
 Khamney
 Yeke-Cäkir
 Mikhaylovka
 Ulekchin
 Naryn
 Nizhny Torey
 Oyor
 Nizhny Burgaltay
 Petropavlovka
 Botsy
 Naushki
 Kyakhta
 Chikoy
 Kiran
 Bolshaya Kudara
 Şarağol
 Ust-Dunguy
 Ust-Dunguy
 Menzo
 Baldzhikan
 Ust Bukukun
 Altın
 Gavan
 Tyrin
 Verkhniy Ulkhun
 Mikhaylo-Pavlovsk
 Öpör-Toqtor
 Buylesan
 Solovyevsk

See also
 Mongolia–Russia relations

References

 
Borders of the Soviet Union
Mongolia–Soviet Union relations
Borders of Mongolia
Borders of Russia
International borders
Mongolia–Russia relations